"The Wizard" is a song by British rock band Uriah Heep, from their 1972 album Demons and Wizards. It was the first single to be lifted from the album. It was composed by Mark Clarke and Ken Hensley. It is a gentle, semi-acoustic ballad whose lyrics deal with a wanderer meeting "the Wizard of a thousand kings". This song is the first Uriah Heep single which had a music video. 

The song was composed by keyboardist-guitarist Ken Hensley and the band's short time bassist Mark Clarke. "The Wizard" also was the only composition that includes Clarke as a member of the band.
The song charted at #34 in Germany and at #8 in Switzerland.

Charts

Personnel
 Mick Box – guitar
 Lee Kerslake – drums
 Mark Clarke – vocals, bass guitar
 Ken Hensley – keyboards, 12-string acoustic guitar
 David Byron – lead vocals

References

Songs about wizards
1972 singles
1972 songs
Bronze Records singles
Fantasy music
Songs written by Ken Hensley
Songs written by Mark Clarke
Uriah Heep (band) songs
Folk rock songs